Muhammad Jamiruddin Sarkar; is a Bangladeshi lawyer and politician who served as the acting President of Bangladesh in 2002. He served as the Speaker of the Parliament of Bangladesh. He is one of the founding members of the Bangladesh Nationalist Party and was a member of the standing committee, which was the policy making body of the party, from its inception.

Early life
Sircar was born to Moulvi Ali Baksh and Begum Fakhrunnessa in Panchagarh in north Bengal. He obtained his M.A and LL.B degrees from the University of Dhaka and joined the bar to practice law in 1960. He left for London in 1961 for the degree of Barrister-at-Law and was admitted and called to the Bar by the Honourable Society of Lincoln's Inn, to practice law as a member of the English Bar as well as Commonwealth Countries Bar.

Political career

Mr Sircar went on the Supreme Court of Bangladesh to work as a Lawyer in constitutional, civil and criminal laws. In 1977, he was selected by the then President Ziaur Rahman as a member of the Bangladesh Delegation to the United Nations General Assembly. As a delegate he looked after the Legal Committee and continued in this role for the next four years between 1977 and 1980. In 1981, as a State Minister of
Bangladesh Government for the Ministry of Foreign Affairs, he travelled to the UN to make deliberation on Middle East peace process and disarmament. He later attended the Non-aligned Movement's Labor Ministers Conference in Baghdad. He was elected to the Parliament as a candidate of Bangladesh Nationalist Party from Panchagarh-1 in the General Election of 1996 & 2001
and from Dhaka-9 in the by-election of 1991 in the seat of Begum Khaleda Zia. He lost the election in the December 2008. He was elected in Parliament in a by-election from Bogra-6 on 3 April 2009. Bogra-6 was vacated, along with Bogra-7, by former Prime Minister Khaleda Zia.

From 28 October 2001 to 25 January 2009, he served as the Speaker of the Jatiya Sangsad. On 21 June 2002, he became acting president because of the resignation of A. Q. M. Badruddoza Chowdhury. He remained acting president until a new president was elected on 6 September 2002. As speaker he refused to allow discussion on the 2004 Dhaka grenade attack in Parliament. He faced criticism for being partisan in allocating seats in the parliament. In 2008, his defence of Bangladesh Nationalist Party and call for it return to power drew criticism. The Daily Star wrote that the speaker should be above political fray.

On 13 April 2009, an Awami League led parliamentary probe body reported that Sircar took 2.7 million taka unlawfully as medical bill without the permission of Prime Minister Khaleda Zia during his tenure as speaker of the parliament. On 8 November 2012, the Anti-Corruption Commission filed the politically motivated  charges against him, alleging he misappropriating 3.3 million taka. Sircar moved the High Court Division of the Supreme Court of Bangladesh and the proceedings were stayed and thereafter the Appellate Division passed an order to dispose off Sircar's judicial review applications before the High Court Division  The judiciary of Bangladesh is severely criticized of being controlled by the government where a former chief justice was forced out of office unconstitutionally 

In 2018, he worked as the defence lawyer of former Prime Minister Khaleda Zia in the Zia Orphanage Trust corruption case.

Personal life
Sircar is married to Nur Akhtar. Together they have a daughter, Nilufar Jamir and two sons, Nawshad Zamir and Naufal Zamir.

Bibliography
 Glimpses of International Law (1997);
 The Law of the Sea (2003);
 Stronger United Nations for Peaceful Welfare World (2003);
 London-er Chatro Andolon Bangla (2005);
 London-e Bondhu Bandhob Bangla (2006);
 Oshtom Shongshoder Speaker Bangla (2006);
 Pal Raj theke Plolashi ebong British Raj theke Bongo Bhobon Bangla (2006).
 Law of the International Rivers and others Water Courses (2007);
 Pakistan-er Gonotontrer Biporjoy ebong Shadhin Bangladesh-er Obbhuddoy Bangla (2008)

References

1931 births
Living people
People from Panchagarh District
University of Dhaka alumni
7th Jatiya Sangsad members
Presidents of Bangladesh
Speakers of the Jatiya Sangsad
Bangladesh Nationalist Party politicians
8th Jatiya Sangsad members
State Ministers of Land
State Ministers of Housing and Public Works (Bangladesh)
State Ministers of Foreign Affairs (Bangladesh)
Law, Justice and Parliamentary Affairs ministers of Bangladesh
Education ministers of Bangladesh
Science and Technology ministers of Bangladesh
9th Jatiya Sangsad members